The Lakeland Book of the Year, also known as the Hunter Davies Lakeland Book of the Year is an award given annually for a book "set in or featuring Cumbria in some way", and is named for the Lake District of north west England. It was founded by writer Hunter Davies in 1984 and is administered by Cumbria Tourism. The judges in 2021, for books published in 2020, were Hunter Davies, Eric Robson and Fiona Armstrong. The prizes are traditionally announced at a gala lunch in June, although in 2020 the proceedings took place online because of COVID-19.  

There are a number of awards for specific categories of books, and an overall winner is selected as the "Book of the Year". In the 2021 competition (for books published in 2020), the categories were:
Fiction
Guides and Places
Illustration and Presentation
Landscape and Tradition
Literature and Poetry 
People and Business

Winners

References

English literary awards
Cumbria
Awards established in 1984
1984 establishments in England